Bruce Kamau (born 28 March 1995) is a Kenyan professional footballer who plays as a winger for A-League Men club Melbourne Victory on loan from OFI Crete. Born in Kenya, Kamau is a youth international for Australia.

Early life
Born in Kenya, Kamau moved to Australia aged 4. He attended Rostrevor College.

Career

Adelaide United
He made his senior professional debut for Adelaide United in the 2014 FFA Cup in a match against Wellington Phoenix at the Marden Sports Complex on 5 August 2014. Adelaide won the match 1–0 in regulation time. He subsequently made his A-League debut in a match against Brisbane Roar in Round one of the 2014–15 A-League season.

Kamau scored his first A-League goal for Adelaide in a 1–0 win away to Melbourne Victory on 19 February 2016, in the 90th minute of the match in Round 20 of the 2015–16 season. Kamau started in the 2016 A-League Grand Final, scoring the first goal of the game.

Melbourne City
At the end of the season, after winning the Premiership and Championship with Adelaide United, Kamau joined Melbourne City. Kamau made his unofficial City debut in a 4–0 pre-season victory over NPL Victoria side Melbourne Knights FC.

Western Sydney Wanderers
On 3 May 2018, Kamau was released by Melbourne City and joined Western Sydney Wanderers. The club announced a squad update on 16 October 2020 where Kamau was omitted suggesting his departure from the club, but a month later announced that Kamau had re-signed. At the end of his contract, Kamau left the club to take up an opportunity overseas.

OFI Crete 
In July 2021, Kamau joined Greek Super League club OFI Crete on a three-year contract.

Loan to Melbourne Victory
In February 2023, Kamau was loaned to A-League Men club Melbourne Victory until the end of the 2022–23 A-League Men season.

Career statistics

Club

International

Honours
Adelaide United
 A-League Premiership: 2015–16
 A-League Championship: 2015–16
 FFA Cup: 2014

Melbourne City
 FFA Cup: 2016

References

External links

1995 births
Living people
Footballers from Nairobi
Association football midfielders
Australian soccer players
Australia youth international soccer players
Kenyan footballers
Kenyan emigrants to Australia
Australian people of Kenyan descent
People educated at Rostrevor College
Kenyan expatriate footballers
Adelaide United FC players
Melbourne City FC players
Western Sydney Wanderers FC players
OFI Crete F.C. players
Melbourne Victory FC players
A-League Men players
Super League Greece players
Australian expatriate soccer players
Australian expatriate sportspeople in Greece
Kenyan expatriate sportspeople in Greece
Expatriate footballers in Greece